William Horman (c. 1440 – April 1535) was a headmaster at Eton and Winchester College in the early Tudor period of English history.
He is best known for his Latin grammar textbook the Vulgaria, which created controversy at the time due to its unconventional approach in first giving examples of translations of English writings on different topics, and later discussing the rules of grammar. He asserted, probably following Quintilian, that grammar cannot be perfect without music.

Life
Horman was born in Salisbury, Wiltshire, England around 1440. He was admitted as a pupil at Wykeham's college at Winchester in 1468. According to some accounts, he studied at the University of Cambridge. However, in 1477 he was elected a fellow of New College, Oxford, in the same year that William Caxton printed his first book in England. He took a Masters of Arts degree, and in 1485 became the headmaster of Eton. He left Eton in 1494, and became headmaster of Winchester from 1495 to 1501. At that time, the Winchester post was more prestigious and paid better. Later, Horman returned to Eton as a fellow and vice-provost, where there is evidence that both Greek and Latin were taught. He continued there until his death.

When he was almost eighty years old, in 1519 Horman published the Vulgaria, a Latin textbook.
He says in the introduction that he composed the book when a schoolmaster, "many years before".
In a contract dated 28 June 1519, he ordered Richard Pynson to produce 800 whole and perfect copies of these Latin texts, in 35 chapters. The contract is notable as one of the earliest surviving agreements of this nature.

Horman became an antagonist in the Grammarians' War, which erupted when Robert Whittington attacked the new approach of teaching by example. Whittington at the time was England's leading author of textbooks, and preferred the traditional system of learning the precepts of grammar by rote before progressing to examples. In some ways Horman was more traditional than Whittington, since he rejected the common vocabulary of Medieval Latin and idealised the "pure" Ciceronian form of Latin while Whittington was more pragmatic in his views.

Horman died in April 1535, when in his nineties, an extreme old age for the time.

Work
The Vulgaria is the more important of Horman's surviving works, a Latin textbook based on humanist principles published in 1519. The book was dedicated to William Atwater, Bishop of Lincoln. The preface of the book included verses by William Lilye and by Robert Aldrich, the master at Eton from 1515 to 1521. The name Vulgaria is used in the Latin sense of "common things", in this case "everyday sayings". The book is a collection of English sentences followed by their Latin translations, covering subjects related to school, manners, upbringing, religion, natural history and many other subjects. The textbook is not radically different from previous Latin grammars, differing mainly in its arrangement by subject rather than by grammatical structure. In this, it followed the principles laid out by Erasmus.

The Vulgaria draws from a variety of sources, for example including the saying "It does no good for all truth to be told nor all wrong imputed" derived from the Old English Durham Proverbs. Another example of a proverb to be translated is "Somtyme of a myshappe cometh a good turne". The proverb "necessity is the mother of invention" appears, perhaps for the first time in English, translated as "Mater artium necessitas". Other sayings included the advice not to "offereth a candell to the deuyll", to remember that "many a ragged colt proued to a good horse", "it is better a chylde unborne than untaught", "manners maketh man" and "one scabbed shepe marreth a hole flocke". "That the whiche muste be wyll be" reflects the Spanish "Que Sera, Sera". The book gives practical advice. "At a soden shyfte leere [empty] barellis, tyed together, with boardis above, make passage over a streme". He says that alleys in gardens, covered with vines, "do great pleasure with the shadow in parchynge heat, and clusters of grapis maketh a pleasant walkynge alley".

The Vulgaria is interesting in the light that it throws on the times. For example, the book is the first to mention "ceruse", a mixture of white lead and vinegar used by wealthy women to whiten their skin. The book defines blotting paper: "Blottynge papyr serveth to drye weete wryttynge, lest there be made blottis or blurris". Children's rattles are first mentioned in the book.  He describes the use of wooden swords, or "wasters", used for training: "Let us pley at buckeler and at waster in feyre game". The sentence "We wyll playe with a ball full of wynde" (which Horman translates as "lusui erit nobis follis pugillari spritu tumens") is one of the earliest references to the game of football being played at public schools. He praised the value of sports in letting children find an outlet for their energy as a break from their studies: "There muste be a measure in gyuynge of remedies or sportynge to chyldren, leste they be wery of goynge to theyr boke if they haue none, or waxe slacke if they haue to many". 

Horman's Antibossicon G. Hormani ad G. Lilium published in 1521 is a riposte to criticism of the Vulgaria. It takes the form of a series of letters to Horman, and from him to William Lilye, another grammarian who supported the new teaching approach. Lilye also published an Antibossicum, and the two were published together as a pamphlet. In his Apologeticon contra Rob. Whittingtoni Protova tis Angliæ incivilem indoctamque criminationem, he dissected some of Whittington's poetry and treated it to severe criticism. Horman also translated several of the Greek classics and wrote various treatises on philosophy and science, but these have not survived.

Bibliography

References

Sources

Further reading 

1535 deaths
16th-century English educators
16th-century English writers
16th-century male writers
People from Salisbury
Fellows of New College, Oxford
Grammarians of Latin
Head Masters of Eton College
Headmasters of Winchester College
People educated at Winchester College
Year of birth uncertain